The  is a line of medium-duty commercial vehicle produced by Mitsubishi Fuso Truck and Bus Corporation. The range was primarily available in other big-size and mid-size trucks.

Most mid-size and big-size models of the truck are distinguishable by a front 'Fighter' badge, but the common Mitsubishi badge is usually used on the rear.

First generation (1984–1992)

The first generation Fighter was originally introduced in February 1984 as a successor to the FK series. The appearance design with the smaller Canter and the larger The Great, the model that was one of the image of the Fuso products. Headlight left and right door bet part panel cab after the window is common with The Great. In most export markets, four round headlights were fitted rather than the square lamps used in Japan. In December 1987, it upgraded with a radiator grille  upper part to the mounting the panel mall. Turbo engine with 230 horsepower additional intercooler. The FM series was updated in February 1988, in addition to the 4WD-based FL vehicles. February 1990 saw the first year of Heisei emissions compliance. We have changed the design of the radiator grille.

In July 1991, the Fighter received a facelift including new corner lamps and ABS as standard equipment on the FK. Also new was a  naturally aspirated engine. This year, the commercial catchphrase of the Fighter was "in Japan of the road than anyone, Fuso Fighter". To commercial song, Ken Takakura, Yashiro Aki "Elegy" of is used. Zhengfei Emissions compliance on Fighter range In China the Fighter FN was marketed as the JiaFeng CA1091/CA141. The FK/FN Fighter was marketed in Singapore as the Mitsubishi Fuso FK415, FK458, FN527, FN628, and FN627.

Second generation (1992–present)

The second generation (also called Furikon Fighter) was introduced in July 1992. Hong Kong actor Jackie Chan appeared in a commercial ads of the Fighter truck. In export markets, it was fitted with a rectangular 4-lamp corner headlights. April 1995 saw the 1994 exhaust emission regulations that was fitted with the Fighter. A load capacity of 7.5 tons and low-floor full-time 4WD come from the FK variants was added in December 1996. In February 1997 the Fighter was updated.  The rear wheel Park brake can be installed as an option, as standard equipment in more than GVW11t car. The standard side door beams, an impact-absorbing steering on all models. 200 standard equipped with a hill start assist device "EZGO" the horsepower or more of the type of vehicle. Change the passenger seat window to type hoisting from equation. To abolish the garnish on the fender. The short cab-based Fighter NX was added in 1998. This also become bed length is taken long 305mm have the same overall length as the 4-tons chassis, it has become possible to increase the amount of load (not the load weight). it is almost that is used only as unsuitable a city flights and suburbs flights to long-haul flights the minute the bed is gone. Norika Fujiwara featured in the Fighter NX commercial adds.

On 14 April 1999, the implement the first of minor trucks, dubbed the New Fighter. The exterior design the front of the lighting device class (discharge headlamps of the second generation Fighter and The Great retrofit Allowed a type), fixes the interior design, exterior design with the Super Great has become a common image.  In addition, the engine of OHC 6M60 and 6M61 Change in order to meet 1998 exhaust emission regulations, the air bag is equipped. In February 2002, the implementing the improvement, the additional 5-speed automatic and turn lamp headlights, it has increased the standard color variations in nine colors. Also in July the same year the CNG (compressed natural gas) was added to the range. In June 2004, the new short-term regulatory compliance in the Fighter series, with  mechanical automatic has been set.

In October 2005, the second minor changes of the Fighter, known as Best One Fighter. Classes only standard equipped with a wedge-type full air brakes more than 11-tons of GVW truck.  Exterior and such as to place the first time the headlight to bumper from the company was enhanced and redesigned to texture the interior design. Exterior design has been a thing that reflects the image of the new Super Great concept model from the Fuso Concept. At the same time it was corresponding to the latest safety-related regulations. Also, is adopted Best One system, the position of the head lights (bumper light but there is a basic, cab light specification can also be selected. Cab light specification only type of headlight is within a corner panel), seat upholstery, plating It has become possible to choose the equipment, such as a bumper freely. In 2007 saw the 15 June 2005 exhaust emission regulations (new long-term regulations) was fitted with the Fighter. In September 2008 the all-wheel air suspension added with the Fighter vehicles. In June 2010, sequentially from, and released the post new long-term exhaust gas regulations conformity car. Use of the name "Bluetec technology", (except 20 tons class) to achieve the fit, and further 2015 fiscal weight vehicle fuel economy standards to the post new long-term exhaust gas regulations by using a high combustion efficiency engine + DPF + urea SCR. Mesh grille of the front grille in the design surface. The 8-tons of GVW class as a lineup, and add a six-cylinder engine 220 horsepower. In July 2011, the 8-tons of GVW equipped with a six-cylinder engine 240 horsepower and a six-cylinder engine 270 horsepower has been added, fit in all cars post new long-term exhaust emission regulations.

Body type
Fighter mid-size
Fighter mid-size NX
Fighter mid-size CNG
Fighter big-size narrow cab (see big-size wide cab by Mitsubishi Fuso Super Great)
Fighter big-size narrow cab 4WD

Models

Philippines
Fighter FM
FM657H
FM657N
Fire Truck

Also in the Philippines
Fighter FK
FK-MR
FK-SR
FK-HR
FK200
FK417

Indonesia
Fighter FM & FN
FM 517 HS
FM 517 HL
FN 517 HL
FN 517 ML
FN 517 ML2
FN 617
FN 627
FM 65 FS
FM 65 FL
FN 61 FS
FN 61 FM
FN 62 F

US and Canada, Japan
Fighter FK
FK-MR
FK-SR
FK-HR
FK200
FK417
Fighter FM
FM-HD
FM-MR
FM-SR
FM-HR
FM64F
FM260
FM330
FM555
FM555F
FM617
FM617L

New Zealand

4X2 Fighter
FK200K1
FK200K6
FK200H6
FK250L6
FM250H6
FM250M6
FM250A6
FM280H6
FM280M6
6x2 Fighter
FM220R2
FU220R2
FU250L6
FU250R6
FU280U6
6X4 Fighter
FN280K6
FN280U6

Australia
All models are manual transmission unless stated otherwise.
FK
1024 SWB/MWB/LWB/XLWB
1024 Auto LWB
1024 Crew Cab MWB
1224 SWB/LWB
1224 Auto SWB
1227 LWB/XLWB
1424 LWB
1427 XLWB
FM
1627 SWB/XLWB/XXLWB
1627 Auto XLWB/XXLWB
FN
2427 XLWB/XXLWB
2427 Auto XLWB/XXLWB

Engine
For details see List of Mitsubishi Fuso engines
4M50-T5/T6 - 180/210ps
6D14
6D15
6D16-T2 - 220ps/2800rpm 687N•m/1400rpm
6D16-T7 - 255ps
6D17 - 8202cc, 118 x 125mm, 225ps
6M60-T1 - 240ps/2600rpm 686N•m/1400rpm
6M60-T2 - 270ps/2600rpm 785N•m/1400rpm
6M60-T2 - 280ps/2600rpm 801N•m/1400rpm
6M60-T2(new) - 270ps/2500rpm 785N•m/1100~2400rpm
6M60-T3 - 220ps/2200rpm 745N•m/1400~2000rpm
6M61 (GNC) - 225HP
6M61 (CNG) - 225HP
 OM364 OM366 (Mercedes-Benz) 395HP

See also
Mitsubishi Fuso Truck and Bus Corporation

References

External links

Mitsubishi Fuso Fighter Japan - Fighter, Fighter Big-Size, Fighter 4WD, Fighter CNG
Mitsubishi Fuso Fighter Worldwide - FK, FL, FM
Mitsubishi Fuso Fighter USA - FK200, FM260/FM330
Mitsubishi Fuso Fighter New Zealand
Mitsubishi Fuso Fighter South Africa - FK, FM
Fuso Fighter Australia

Fighter
Cab over vehicles
Vehicles introduced in 1984